Bib, bib, BIB or BiB may refer to:

Bib

Clothing
 Bib (garment), a piece of fabric or plastic that covers the wearer's chest
 Bib shorts, cycle clothing
 A scrimmage vest, sportswear used to differentiate players from one-another by colour

Other uses
 Bib (tribe), in the Hazara Division of Pakistan
 Bib Fortuna, a character in Star Wars
 Bib., an abbreviation of Bible
 bib., an abbreviation of bibliography
 .bib, the file extension of a BibTeX bibliographic file in TeX and LaTeX
 Competition numbers in sports, derived from the garment bib
 A nickname for Bibendum or the Michelin Man
 A freeze-resistant version of a spigot
 Trisopterus luscus, a species of fish

Acronym
 Back in Black, an album by the group AC/DC
 Bag-in-box, a packaging method for wine, battery acid, and other fluids
 Biennial of Illustration Bratislava, an award for illustration in children's books
 Board for International Broadcasting, a former U.S. governmental organization
 Business is Business, a type of business war games
 Federal Institute for Population Research in Wiesbaden, Germany

See also

 
 
 
 
 
 Bibb (disambiguation)